Alexander Gelbukh (born 1962) is a Russian professor and a member of Mexican Academy of Sciences. He has worked at the Centro de Investigación en Computación, Instituto Politécnico Nacional. His research interest is about computational linguistics. In 2000, he founded CICLing conference  to exchange of opinions between the scientists of different countries in the growing area of computational linguistics and intelligent text processing.

References

External links
 Official website

1962 births
Russian academics
Living people
Academic staff of the Instituto Politécnico Nacional